Ictinogomphus is a genus of dragonflies in either the family Gomphidae or Lindeniidae. 
They are medium to large, yellow and black with clear wings. Species occur in Africa, Asia and Australia.

Genera
The genus Ictinogomphus includes the following species:
Ictinogomphus alaquopterus 
Ictinogomphus angulosus 
Ictinogomphus australis  - Australian Tiger
Ictinogomphus celebensis 
Ictinogomphus decoratus  - Common flangetail
Ictinogomphus dobsoni  - Pilbara Tiger
Ictinogomphus (Cinitogomphus) dundoensis  - Swamp Tigertail
Ictinogomphus ferox  - Common Tiger, Common Tigertail
Ictinogomphus fraseri 
Ictinogomphus kishori 
Ictinogomphus paulini  - Cape York Tiger
Ictinogomphus pertinax 
Ictinogomphus pugnovittatus 
Ictinogomphus rapax  - Common Clubtail
Ictinogomphus regisalberti 
Ictinogomphus tenax

Notes on taxonomy
Jules Rambur originally described this genus as Ictinus in 1842.
However, at the time there already existed a genus of beetle also named Ictinus described by François Laporte in 1834.
In 1934, John Cowley, an English entomologist, renamed this species to Ictinogomphus in deference to Rambur's original name. Cowley is now regarded as the authority, and this genus can be formally written as: Ictinogomphus .

The Australian Faunal Directory considers the genus Ictinogomphus to belong to the family Lindeniidae.
The World Odonata List at Slater Museum of Natural History, University of Puget Sound considers the genus Ictinogomphus to belong to the family Gomphidae.

References

External links

Lindeniidae
Gomphidae
Anisoptera genera
Odonata of Asia
Odonata of Africa
Odonata of Australia
Taxa named by John Cowley (entomologist)
Insects described in 1934
Taxonomy articles created by Polbot